The 2020 Women's Africa Cup of Nations qualification was a scheduled women's football competition which would have decided the participating teams of the 2020 Women's Africa Cup of Nations.

A total of 12 teams would qualify to play in the final tournament, including the hosts which would qualify automatically.

On 30 June 2020, following a decision by CAF, the final tournament was cancelled due to the COVID-19 pandemic.

Draw
A record total of 36 (out of 54) CAF member national teams entered the qualifying rounds. The draw was held on 4 December 2019 at the CAF headquarters in Cairo, Egypt. The draw procedures were as follows:
In the first round, the 28 teams were drawn into 14 ties, with teams divided into four pots based on their geographical zones and those in the same pot drawn to play against each other.
In the second round, the 14 preliminary round winners and the eight teams receiving byes to the second round were allocated into 11 ties based on the first round tie numbers, with eight first round winners playing against the eight teams receiving byes, and the other six first round winners playing against each other.

Notes
Teams in bold qualified for the final tournament.
(W): Withdrew after draw

Did not enter

Format
Qualification ties were to be played on a home-and-away two-legged basis. If the aggregate score was tied after the second leg, the away goals rule would be applied, and if still tied, the penalty shoot-out (no extra time) would be used to determine the winner.

Schedule
The first round matches were originally scheduled for 6–14 April 2020. On 13 March 2020, the CAF announced that all first round matches had been postponed until further notice.

The second round matches were originally scheduled for 1–9 June 2020. On 3 April 2020, FIFA had recommended that all June 2020 international matches be postponed.

On 30 June 2020, the CAF announced that the 2020 Africa Women Cup of Nations had been cancelled.

Bracket
The 11 winners of the second round would have qualified for the 2020 Africa Women Cup of Nations.

First round

|}

Second round
Winners would have qualified for 2020 Africa Women Cup of Nations.

|}

References

Qualification
2020
Women Cup of Nations
2020 in women's association football
Association football events cancelled due to the COVID-19 pandemic